Hurakan Condor is a 'giant drop' ride located in PortAventura Park, in the resort PortAventura World, Catalonia, Spain. The car slowly tilts forward as it climbs the last few feet. The car then slowly drops back into the station. The ride and queues are intensively themed around a Mexican background, in order to fit in with the Mexico area of the park. Depending on which side of the tower the rider boards the ride experience differs greatly. Riders can either sit regularly, sit in tilting seats or ride standing, but without a floor.

See also 
Drop tower

References

External links
PortAventura World
Hurakan Condor - Intamin Amusement Rides

Drop tower rides
Amusement rides introduced in 2005
Amusement rides manufactured by Intamin
Towers completed in 2005
2005 establishments in Spain